Kristýna Plíšková and Evgeniya Rodina were the defending champions, but chose not to defend their title.

Asia Muhammad and Taylor Townsend won the title, defeating Caty McNally and Jessica Pegula in the final, 6–4, 6–4.

Seeds

Draw

Draw

References

External Links
Main Draw

Oracle Challenger Series - Doubles
2020 Women's Doubles